Ernő Gubányi (born October 13, 1950, in Salgótarján) is a former Hungarian handball player who competed in the 1976 Summer Olympics and in the 1980 Summer Olympics.

In 1976 he was part of the Hungarian team which finished sixth in the Olympic tournament. He played all five matches and scored eleven goals.

Four years later he finished fourth with the Hungarian team in the 1980 Olympic tournament. He played all six matches and scored five goals.

Awards
 Nemzeti Bajnokság I Top Scorer: 1970

References
 
 Nemzetisport.hu 

1950 births
Living people
Hungarian male handball players
Olympic handball players of Hungary
Handball players at the 1976 Summer Olympics
Handball players at the 1980 Summer Olympics
People from Salgótarján
Sportspeople from Nógrád County